Dose is the second studio album by the American alternative rock band Latin Playboys. It was released on March 2, 1999 on Atlantic Records. The album was produced by Mitchell Froom and engineered by Tchad Blake, both of whom are also members of the band. As the album's engineer, Blake recorded all of the background sounds that appear on the album.

Recording
Dose was primarily recorded at the home of one of the band's members, David Hidalgo, on an 8-track tape. It was engineered at Tchad Blake's Sunset Sound Factory in Hollywood.

Release and marketing
Dose was released on March 2, 1999 by Atlantic Records, which decided not to release a single from it. Atlantic's product manager, Pat Creed, told CMJ New Music Report that he wanted people to find their own favorite track on the album, which he described as "not your typical radio record, but...one of those great things that is an album, something that hangs together well.

Music and lyrics
Hidalgo said in 1999 that Dose had a significantly different sound than the group's self-titled debut. He told the Washington Post that:  Brett Anderson of Salon wrote in his review of the album that "Experimentalism doesn’t get any more organic than this. Hidalgo still sings like he’s trying to do his bittersweet memories justice, and even the looped and distorted guitars seem to echo from a more coherent place." The album's lyrics cover many disparate aspects of the experience of L.A.'s's East Side.

Track listing
	"Fiesta Erotica" –	3:09
	"Cuca's Blues" –	3:15
	"Ironsides" –	1:46
	"Mustard" –	3:29
	"Nubian Priestess" –	2:00
	"Dose" –	2:33
	"Latin Trip" –	2:58
	"Tormenta Blvd." –	2:09
	"Lemon 'N Ice" –	3:50
	"Locoman" –	2:49
	"Toro" –	0:38
	"Paletero" –	3:13
	"Paula Y Fred" –	3:06

Personnel

Latin Playboys
David Hidalgo
Louie Perez
Mitchell Froom
Tchad Blake

Other personnel
Tracy Bonham - violin
Lisa Coleman - guest vocals
John Heiden - design
S. Husky Höskulds - assistant engineer
Bob Ludwig - mastering 
Jerry Marotta - drums, percussion
Wendy Melvoin - guest vocals
John Paterno - assistant engineer, mixing assistant

References

1999 albums
Latin Playboys albums
Atlantic Records albums
Albums produced by Mitchell Froom